Jonas Knudsen (born 4 August 2001) is a speedway rider from Denmark.

Speedway career 
Knudsen began his British speedway career riding for the Berwick Bandits in the SGB Championship 2022. His debut had been delayed significantly following work permit issues.

In 2022, Knudsen competed in the Under-21 World Championship scoring 14 points. In 2023, he re-signed for Berwick for the SGB Championship 2023.

Family
His younger brother Jesper Knudsen is also a professional speedway rider.

References 

Living people
2001 births
Danish speedway riders
Berwick Bandits riders